Stanislava Jachnická is a Czech stage and television actress. Czech voice of Lisa Kudrow.

Biography 
She was born 18 August 1965 in Prague, Czechoslovakia. She studied Secondary School of Economics and Theatrical Academy of Musical Arts.

Theatre

ABC Theatre
Our Town .... Mrs. Webb
Everything in the Garden ... Cynthia
Anna Karenina .... Dolly Oblonskaya
Lorna and Ted .... Lorna

Rokoko Theatre
Passion .... Agnes

Filmography 
"Soukromé pasti" (2008) TV series .... (episode ???)
PF 77 (2003)
Postel (1997)
Smůla (1997)
Fany (1995)
Dotyky (1988)

Voice works in the films and TV shows 
Bandslam (2010) .... Karen Burton
Hotel for Dogs (2009) .... Lois Scudder
Happy Endings (2005) .... Mamie
Analyze That (2003) .... Laura McNamara Sobel
Analyze This (2000) .... Laura McNamara Sobel
Hanging Up (2000) .... Maddy Mozell
CSI: NY (2006-2010) .... Stella Bonasera
Cobra 11 (1998-????) .... Andrea Schäfer
Friends (1996-2004) .... Phoebe Buffay Hannigan

Personal life 
She is married. She has a son Matyáš (born 2000) and a daughter Kristýna (born 1992). Their children's name's meaning "Gift by Gods" (Matyáš) and "Christian" (Kristýna).

References

External links 
Stanislava Jachnická (televize.cz)
Rozhovor s dabérkou: Stanislava Jachnická (Žena-in)

Czech stage actresses
Czech television actresses
Living people
1965 births
Czech voice actresses
Actresses from Prague
20th-century Czech actresses
21st-century Czech actresses